German submarine U-224 was a Type VIIC U-boat of Nazi Germany's Kriegsmarine during World War II.

Ordered on 15 August 1940 from the Germaniawerft shipyard in Kiel, she was laid down on 15 July 1941 as yard number 654, launched on 7 May 1942 and commissioned on 20 June.

Design
German Type VIIC submarines were preceded by the shorter Type VIIB submarines. U-224 had a displacement of  when at the surface and  while submerged. She had two shafts and two  propellers.

U-224 was fitted with five  torpedo tubes (four fitted at the bow and one at the stern), fourteen torpedoes, one  deck machine gun, 220 rounds, and a  C/30 anti-aircraft gun. The boat had a complement of between forty-four and sixty.

Wolfpacks
U-224 took part in three wolfpacks, namely:
 Puma (26 – 29 October 1942) 
 Natter (30 October – 8 November 1942) 
 Kreuzotter (8 – 18 November 1942)

Summary of raiding history

See also
 Mediterranean U-boat Campaign (World War II)

References

Bibliography

External links

German Type VIIC submarines
World War II submarines of Germany
U-boats commissioned in 1942
U-boats sunk in 1943
U-boats sunk by Canadian warships
1942 ships
World War II shipwrecks in the Mediterranean Sea
Ships built in Kiel
U-boats sunk by depth charges
Maritime incidents in January 1943